Rasbora meinkeni is a species of cyprinid fish in the genus Rasbora from Sumatra.

Etymology
The fish is named in honor of aquarist/ichthyologist Herrmann Meinken (1896-1976), who gave de Beaufort a this species in the form of a breeding pair on which description is based.

References 

Rasboras
Freshwater fish of Sumatra
Taxa named by Lieven Ferdinand de Beaufort
Fish described in 1931
Cyprinid fish of Asia